Jens Schmidt (born 3 April 1963) is a German former football goalkeeper who played for Chemnitzer FC.

Club career 
He played over 65 East German top-flight matches.

International career 
Jens Schmidt won – in East Germany's last ever international – one cap in 1990.

References

External links
 
 
 

1963 births
Living people
German footballers
East German footballers
East Germany international footballers
Association football goalkeepers
Chemnitzer FC players
FC Erzgebirge Aue players
DDR-Oberliga players